Asia Business News (ABN) is a business news television channel based in Singapore. A subsidiary of Dow Jones & Company that also owns The Wall Street Journal Asia daily, it was the sister network of London-based European Business News (EBN). Its programmes originate from Singapore. It was officially opening ceremony at grand opening or formally opening breakfast in Singapore on 1 November 1993 at 6:00am SST based in Singapore and it operated from ABN's head office and headquarters in Singapore.

History

Opening breakfast
Asia Business News (ABN) was officially opening ceremony at grand opening or formally opening morning in Singapore on 1 November 1993 at 6:00am SST after officially opening ceremony by President of Singapore Ong Teng Cheong based in Singapore owned and company by Dow Jones & Company who that owns The Wall Street Journal Asia daily with the first programme at launching ceremony as Asian Wall Street Journal on Air. It was originally based in Singapore. Anchors/presenters such as Coco Quisumbing, Martin Soong, Sydnie Kohara, Karen Koh and Lynette Lithgow. Correspondents such as Keiko Bang, Lisa Barron, Stuart Pallister, Jim Sciutto and Chris Slaughter were part of the original ABN team which includes around 170 Singapore based staff. ABN programme such as Breakfast Briefing, Asian Wall Street Journal on Air, Trading Day, Asia Market Digest, Storyboard, Far Eastern Economic Review on Air, Money Talk, dot.com and Corporate Raiders.

Becomes CNBC Asia
On 31 January 1998 at 11:59pm SST the channel officially merged with NBC's CNBC Asia. Initially, most of ABN's programmes and presenters migrated to the new channel and it operated from ABN's former headquarters in Singapore.  The officially merged channel was officially initially named CNBC Asia Business News but on 30 June 1998 at 11:59pm SST it was officially referred to as CNBC Asia.

Programmes
Breakfast Briefing
Asian Wall Street Journal on Air
Trading Day
Asia Market Digest
Storyboard
Far Eastern Economic Review on Air
Money Talk
dot.com
Corporate Raiders

Anchors/presenters
Coco Quisumbing
Martin Soong
Sydnie Kohara
Karen Koh
Lynette Lithgow

Correspondents
Keiko Bang
Lisa Barron
Stuart Pallister
Jim Sciutto
Chris Slaughter

References

Defunct television channels
Television in Singapore
Television stations in Singapore
Broadcasting in Singapore
Mass media in Singapore
Mass media in Southeast Asia
Television news in Singapore
Television channels and stations established in 1993
Television channels and stations disestablished in 1998
Defunct mass media in Singapore